Qin Ming is a fictional character in Water Margin, one of the Four Great Classical Novels in Chinese literature. Nicknamed "Fiery Thunderbolt", he ranks seventh among the 36 Heavenly Spirits, the first third of the 108 Stars of Destiny.

Background
A native of Kaizhou (開州; present-day Fengcheng, Liaoning), Qin Ming is a high-ranking military commander serving in Qingzhou (青州; in present-day Shandong). He is nicknamed "Fiery Thunderbolt" due to his thunderous voice, fiery temper and impetuousness in battles, which make him a fearsome but reckless warrior.  His weapon is a sort of spiked club known in Chinese as "wolf's teeth mace".

Conflict with the bandits of Mount Qingfeng
When Murong Yanda, the governor of Qingzhou, is informed that Hua Rong, the garrison commander of Qingfeng Fort (清風寨; in present-day Qingzhou, Shandong), which is in his jurisdiction, has joined the outlaws at nearby Mount Qingfeng, he orders Qin Ming to lead a military force to eliminate them. Earlier, Qin's martial arts student Huang Xin, who was sent by Murong to Qingfeng Fort to deal with Hua Rong, had captured Hua. But Hua and Song Jiang, Hua's friend and the source of the row, were rescued from him by the three bandit chiefs of Mount Qingfeng - Yan Shun, Wang Ying  and Zheng Tianshou. Huang is forced to hole himself up in the fort. Qin Ming is sent as Mount Qingfeng is deemed hard to suppress.

Qin Ming battles with Hua Rong on horseback but neither prevails. Hua then feigns defeat and flees. Knowing that Qin easily loses his cool, Hua lures him to gallop round Mount Qingfeng. Finally, madly enraged and tired, Qin falls into a dug pit. He is taken to Song Jiang, who unties him and tries to win him over with warm words. Although Qin takes to Song, he turns down his plea, swearing that he would live and die a Song official. But he agrees to rest overnight at the stronghold.

The following day, when Qin Ming returns to Qingzhou, he finds the city's suburb razed with the residents killed. When he reaches Qingzhou, Murong Yanda bars his entry and accuses him from the top of the city's gate of leading the outlaws to commit the carnage. To punish Qin, Murong has executed his entire family, including his wife. Qin tries to force his way into Qingzhou, but gives up under a shower of arrows. As he wonders aimlessly and sorrowfully, he meets Song Jiang, Hua Rong and the bandit chiefs of Mount Qingfeng. He is then told the bloodbath is their work, carried out when he spent the night at the stronghold and led by a man disguised as him. Qin is furious but is appeased after Song says he will arrange for Hua Rong's sister to marry him as compensation.

After defecting to the bandits, Qin Ming convinces Huang Xin to surrender Qingfeng Fort and join the group as well. As Qingzhou is likely to send a bigger force, the group takes Song Jiang's advice and abandons Mount Qingfeng to join the bandits of Liangshan.

Life at Liangshan

Later during Liangshan's battle at Qingzhou, Qin Ming kills Murong Yanda to avenge his family. That came as Huyan Zhuo, after his defeat by Liangshan, has fled to Qingzhou in hope of redeeming himself by wiping out the bandits there. One of the strongholds is Mount Twin Dragons, which, finding Huyan a tough opponent, requested help from Liangshan. Song Jiang came to Qingzhou with a force and captured Huyan, who succumbed to Song's warm treatment. Huyan tricked Murong Yanda to open the gate of Qingzhou. Once the governor appears at the gate, Qin Ming rides forth and smashes him to death.

As one of the best fighters of Liangshan, Qin Ming participates in most of its battles. A few times he almost loses his life due to his impetuous temper.

Death
Qin Ming is appointed as one of the Five Tiger Generals of the Liangshan cavalry after the 108 Stars of Destiny came together in what is called the Grand Assembly, He participates in the campaigns against the Liao invaders and rebel forces in the Song territory following amnesty from Emperor Huizong for Liangshan.

In the attack of Qingxi County (清溪縣; present-day Chun'an County, Zhejiang) in the campaign against the rebel Fang La, Qin Ming fights Fang Jie on horseback. Fang's deputy Du Wei hurls his daggers at Qin. Qin dodges them but Fang seizes the chance to spear him to death.

References
 
 
 
 
 
 
 

36 Heavenly Spirits
Fictional characters from Liaoning